Paroo may refer to:

Paroo, Western Australia, a locality in the Mid West region of Western Australia
Paroo River, a seasonal stream in Australia
Paroo Station, an Australian pastoral lease that operates as a cattle station
Paroo (Vidhan Sabha constituency), an assembly constituency in Muzaffarpur district in the Indian state of Bihar.
 Paroo family, fictional characters in the musical and movie The Music Man